JetSmart Airlines S.A., styled as JetSMART, is an Argentine airline owned by ultra low-cost carrier JetSmart, itself owned by Indigo Partners, a firm that also has stakes in US-based Frontier Airlines, Mexico-based Volaris, and Hungary-based Wizz Air. The airline uses the branding and corporate identity of JetSmart, its parent company, and operates a fleet of Airbus A320-200 aircraft with a base at Aeroparque Jorge Newbery in Buenos Aires. Its aircraft are registered in Argentina.

History 
The airline was originally established in 2016 as Alas del Sur Líneas Aéreas (English: Southern Wing Airlines), with plans to establish a hub in Córdoba. The plans consisted of an April 2017 launch date with short-haul flights from Córdoba to South American destinations added throughout 2017, and long-haul flights from Argentina to North America, Europe, and Asia by 2022. The airline planned to operate a fleet of Airbus A320 and Boeing 777 aircraft. However, as the airline did not receive an air operator's certificate, the start of service was postponed. In June 2018, Indigo Partners acquired the startup airline through its Chilean subsidiary JetSmart, allowing for JetSmart's entry into Argentina's domestic aviation market, and the airline was subsequently rebranded as JetSmart Argentina.

JetSmart Argentina received its air operator's certificate and its first aircraft, an Airbus A320-200 registered as LV-HEK, in December 2018. In February 2019, the airline announced and opened reservations for its first services beginning on 10 April 2019, which were to be operated from a new base at El Palomar Airport near Buenos Aires, after its parent company had previously operated flights to the airport from Santiago de Chile. The airline announced further expansion plans in August 2019, with Rosario as a new destination to launch in November 2019, and that it would increase its Airbus A320 fleet to six aircraft.

Following JetSmart's acquisition of Norwegian Air Argentina in December 2019, the airline planned to launch services from Norwegian's Aeroparque Jorge Newbery base in March 2020. As Argentina's Civil Aviation Administration had not immediately transferred Norwegian's Aeroparque-based route authorities to JetSmart Argentina, Norwegian's fleet of Boeing 737s was wet-leased and operated under a separate, rebranded entity named JetSmart Regional. The services at Aeroparque were ultimately suspended as an impact of the COVID-19 pandemic on aviation, with JetSmart Argentina's existing services additionally relocated from El Palomar Airport to Ezeiza International Airport by late 2020. In early 2021, it was reported that the airline would not return to El Palomar and instead relocate its services to Aeroparque, with operations at the airport and new base launching in March 2021.

Destinations 
, JetSmart Argentina operates or has operated to the following destinations:

Fleet 
The JetSmart Argentina fleet consists of the following aircraft :

References 

Airlines established in 2016
Airlines of Argentina
Low-cost carriers
Argentine brands
Argentine companies established in 2016